Grant Curtis Jennings (born May 5, 1965) is a former National Hockey League defenceman.

Career
Jennings played Midget AAA for the Notre Dame Hounds of Wilcox, Saskatchewan and then moved onto play Junior A hockey in the Saskatchewan Junior Hockey League for the Humboldt Broncos and in the Western Hockey League for the Saskatoon Blades.  He was never selected in the NHL Entry Draft; he was signed as a free agent by the Washington Capitals on June 25, 1985.  In his NHL career, he played for the Capitals, the Hartford Whalers, the Pittsburgh Penguins (with whom he won the Stanley Cup in 1991 and 1992), the Toronto Maple Leafs, and the Buffalo Sabres.

Jennings appeared in 389 NHL games, scoring 14 goals and adding 43 assists.  He also appeared in 54 Stanley Cup playoff games, scoring two goals and recording one assist.  He is currently working for ConocoPhillips as an aircraft mechanic in Alaska.

Career statistics

Regular season and playoffs

Notes

External links

1965 births
Atlanta Knights players
Binghamton Whalers players
Buffalo Sabres players
Canadian ice hockey defencemen
Hartford Whalers players
Ice hockey people from Saskatchewan
Living people
People from Melfort, Saskatchewan
Pittsburgh Penguins players
Quebec Rafales players
Rochester Americans players
San Antonio Dragons players
Saskatoon Blades players
Stanley Cup champions
Toronto Maple Leafs players
Undrafted National Hockey League players
Washington Capitals players